Cardboard Boxer is a 2016 American drama film written and directed by Knate Lee. The film stars Thomas Haden Church, Terrence Howard, Boyd Holbrook, Rhys Wakefield and David Henrie.

The story is centered around a lonely homeless man who is offered by a young, upper class kid to fight fellow down-and-outs for money to video it.

The film was released on September 16, 2016, by Well Go USA Entertainment.

Cast
Thomas Haden Church as Willie
Terrence Howard as Pope
Boyd Holbrook as Pinky
Rhys Wakefield as J.J.	
Zach Villa as Tyler	
Macy Gray as Den Mother
Jack Falahee as Leo
William Stanford Davis as Jazzy
Adam Clark as Skillet
Conrad Roberts as Methusalah
David Henrie as Clean Cut Man
Johanna Braddy as Clean Cut Girl

Release
The film was released on September 16, 2016, by Well Go USA Entertainment.

References

External links
 
 

2016 films
2016 drama films
American drama films
Films about homelessness
2010s English-language films
2010s American films